The Letter is the first single from New Zealand band Midnight Youth's debut album, The Brave Don't Run. The song debuted on the New Zealand Top 40 Singles Chart at 34th place, and peaked at 20th place.

The song was one of five finalists for an APRA SIlver Scroll in 2009 and sold gold, more than 7,500 copies, in New Zealand.

References

Songs about letters (message)
2008 singles
Midnight Youth songs
2008 songs
Warner Music Group singles